Khawaja Nazimuddin (1894–1964) was the second Governor-General of Pakistan and the second Prime Minister of Pakistan.

Nazimuddin may also refer to:

 Md Nazimuddin, Bangladeshi retired lieutenant general
 Khwaja Nizamuddin Bhuyan (1949–1971), Bangladeshi military officer
 Mohammed Nazimuddin Ahmed (born 1985), Bangladeshi cricketer

See also
MV Nazimuddin, ferry boat that sank in 2008

Arabic masculine given names